Douglas M. Hagerman is Senior Vice President, General Counsel, and Secretary of Rockwell Automation, a company based in Milwaukee, Wisconsin. He is responsible for ensuring that the legal team provides substantial advice on legal solutions towards business objectives. Hagerman was previously employed as a litigation partner for Foley and Lardner and also as a co-shair of the Securities Litigation, Enforcement & Regulation Practice Group.

Organizations
Hagerman is a member of the Council of Chief Legal Officers and the Society of Corporate Secretaries & Governance Professionals. He is the director of the National Association of Manufacturers and in 2011 was elected chairman of the board for Milwaukee Symphony Orchestra.

Personal
Hagerman obtained his degree in economics and accounting from Drake University and is a certified accountant. He later earned his law degree from Harvard Law School. He currently lives in Milwaukee with his wife and two daughters.

References

Sources

Living people
Drake University alumni
Harvard Law School alumni
Lawyers from Milwaukee
Wisconsin lawyers
1960 births
20th-century American businesspeople